Stroke is an orchestral composition by the American composer Joan Tower.  The work was commissioned by the Pittsburgh Symphony Orchestra and is dedicated to the composer's brother, who suffered from a debilitating stroke in 2008.  It was first performed in Pittsburgh on May 13, 2011, by the Pittsburgh Symphony Orchestra under the conductor Manfred Honeck.

Composition
Stroke has a duration of roughly 17 minutes and is composed in one continuous movement.  Tower dedicated the piece to her younger brother George, who suffered from a stroke in 2008 at the age of 60 that left his body paralyzed on his entire left side.  She wrote in the score program notes:
Tower concluded, "Stroke is a piece concerned with many emotions, one that hopefully offers a quiet "hope" at the end. With a stroke, it is hard to tell which way it will go."

Instrumentation
The work is scored for an orchestra comprising threeflutes (doubling piccolo), two oboes, three clarinets, two bassoons, four horns, three trumpets, three trombones (doubling bass trombone), tuba, timpani, three percussionists, piano, and strings.

Reception
Reviewing a recording of Stroke, the music critic Leslie Wright called it "a very well constructed piece that grips one throughout its nearly 20-minute length."  He added, "I am quite impressed with this work and think it deserves a place on any contemporary programme, especially if it were performed as well as it is here."

Recording
The Nashville Symphony launched a Kickstarter campaign on August 23, 2013 to raise $15,500 for a recording of Stroke, in addition to Tower's Chamber Dance and her Violin Concerto, to commemorate the composer's 75th birthday.  The campaign closed on September 22, 2013, having successfully raised $15,585.  The recording was released through Naxos Records in May 2015 and was subsequently nominated for the 2016 Grammy Award for Best Classical Contemporary Composition.

References

Compositions by Joan Tower
2010 compositions
Compositions for symphony orchestra
Kickstarter-funded albums
Music commissioned by the Pittsburgh Symphony Orchestra
Stroke